Racing Rioja Club de Fútbol is a football club based in Logroño, La Rioja. Founded in 2018, it plays in Segunda División RFEF – Group 2, holding home games at the Campo de Fútbol El Salvador, with a capacity of 1,160 people.

History
Founded in 2018, the club submitted their registration to the La Rioja Football Federation in August of that year, immediately entering in the Regional Preferente. In their second season, the club won promotion to Tercera División after finishing first in the first tier, also assuring a Copa del Rey berth.

In the 2020–21 Copa del Rey, the club qualified to the first round, but was knocked out by La Liga side SD Eibar.

Former players

  Yuan Yung-cheng – Taiwan youth international player

Season to season

2 seasons in Segunda División RFEF
1 season in Tercera División

References

External links
BDFutbol team profile
Fútbol Regional team profile 
Soccerway team profile

Football clubs in La Rioja (Spain)
Association football clubs established in 2018
2018 establishments in Spain